Beketovskaya is a rural locality (a village) and the administrative center of Beketovskoye Rural Settlement, Vozhegodsky District, Vologda Oblast, Russia. The population was 393 as of 2002.

Geography 
Beketovskaya is located 54 km west of Vozhega (the district's administrative centre) by road. Boyarskaya is the nearest rural locality.

References 

Rural localities in Vozhegodsky District